The Dugway Range is a 13-mile (21 km)  long mountain range located in central-south Tooele County, Utah, on the Juab County north border.

The Dugway Range extends northwesterly into the south of the Great Salt Lake Desert, the region at the west and southwest of the Great Salt Lake, about three times its area, a region of a flat white, salt flat, flat alluvial plains, and some alluvial mountain range pediments. It is the location of the Bonneville Salt Flats.

Description 

The highpoint of the range is Castle Mountain (Utah)), near the range's center, in the main ridgeline region.

Satellite landforms to the range 
Between the Fish Lakes to the southwest, actual foothills above the Great Salt Lake Desert saltflats exist. Washes converge off the southwest flank; they flow southwest, then converge in a shallow valley, with three washes flowing northwest to the GSLD saltflat.

Northeast of the Dugway Range, and east of Granite Mountain are the GSLD salt flats. The valley contains Table Mountain Reservoir ( diameter), located  due-west of Table Mountain, .

South of the range at Pony Express Road, is Dugway Pass. The Dugway foothills from here merge south and south-southeast into the northern foothills of the Thomas Range.

Access 
The route from Fish Springs is called Pony Express Road, and transits around the southern range terminus and the Pyramid Peak spur.

The range can also be accessed from the east, northeast, from Dugway, (by Utah State Route 199 and Utah 196), on unimproved roads.

Off-road routes can reach Granite Mountain (Tooele County, Utah) from the range's north terminus; Granite Peak "island" is  distant across the salt flat desert. Other routes from the east, the Dugway region, also access Granite Mountain's east region.

References

External links 
Castle Mountain (Utah) (approx. range center) (coordinates)
Dugway Pass, and Dugway Ridge region (and Thomas Range), map, (topoquest)
Dugway Range, (northwest), (topoquest)

Great Salt Lake Desert
Mountain ranges of Tooele County, Utah
Mountain ranges of Juab County, Utah
Mountain ranges of the Great Basin
Mountain ranges of Utah